Bilal Khan may refer to:

Bilal Khan (judge) (born 1949), Pakistani judge
Bilal Khan (actor) (1978–2010), Pakistani actor
Bilal Khan (singer) (born 1986), Pakistani singer
Bilal Khan (cricketer) (born 1988), Omani cricketer
Bilal Khan (footballer) (born 1994), Indian footballer
Bilal Akbar Khan, Pakistani politician